The Battle of Višegrad was the battle between Chetnik forces and Axis, and part of an Chetnik offensive in Eastern Bosnia in autumn of 1943, in Axis occupied Yugoslavia during World War II. The Chetnik forces of 2,500 captured Višegrad, destroyed big railway bridge across river Drina and continued their advances toward Rogatica and Sokolac. The German and Ustaše garrison in Višegrad and garrison that protected the bridge of total 1,100 soldiers had 350 dead and 400 wounded. The Chetniks had 21 dead and 30 wounded. In subsequent battle for Rogatica waged ten days later, the Chetniks captured Rogatica and killed more than 200 Axis soldiers.

This Chetniks' victories against Axis were attributed by BBC to Tito's Communist Partisan forces, like in many other cases in that period of the war. Despite many protests, the BBC did not make any corrections. When Chetniks attacked Sokolac on 21 October 1943, the Partisans attacked them from rear and Chetniks found themselves under attack of Axis and Communist forces which ended advances of Chetniks into Eastern Bosnia and toward Sarajevo. This was emphasized by Chetnik commander Mihailović as another proof that Communists collaborated with Ustaše and Germans.

During the period, in which battle of Višegrad took place, the Chetnik command was embedded with a members of the British and American mission.

Forces 
The Battle for Višegrad was part of a Chetnik offensive in Eastern Bosnia. The Chetnik headquarters were in Višegrad and Dobrun during this offensive. The Chetniks mobilized 15-18,000 soldiers in four corps (Romanija, Cer-Majevica, Mačva and Avala Corps). The offensive, also called the Third Chetnik Uprising, was commanded by Zaharije Ostojić while Chetniks from Western Serbia were under command of Dragoslav Račić.

The Chetniks were accompanied by members of British mission, with brigadier Charles Armstrong, Archie Jack and Bill Hudson, who arrived to Chetnik headquarters at the end of September 1943, and by the ranking American officer attached to the British mission, Lieutenant Colonel Albert Seitz. One of the aims of Chetnik attack on Višegrad was destruction of a railway bridge over River Drina, as instructed by Brigadier Armstrong. Less than a week after Armstrong arrived at Chetnik headquarters he and Seitz and Hudson saw a successful Chetnik attack on Višegrad and destruction of the railway bridge across Drina. Armstrong and Seitz took part in a Chetnik action against Axis-controlled units protecting the railway bridge over Drina near Višegrad.

The Axis garrison in Višegrad had more than 800 soldiers while another garrison of 300 German soldiers was protecting main bridge over the River Drina. Forces present in Višegrad included the 2nd Battalion of the 6th Mountain Regiment with around 115 Home Guards, and two companies of the German 370th Regiment of the 369th Infantry Division, with a platoon of the gendarmerie. There were also local Muslim militias, numbering 400 armed men according to Chetnik sources. The commander of Višegrad's defence was major Berislav Predojević.

The Chetnik forces included the Cer Corps and parts of the Drina Corps commanded by Dragoslav Račić, who led the attack on the right side of the Drina, and the 1st Rogatica Brigade on the left side of the Drina. The Chetnik force of 2,500 soldiers that attacked Višegrad used heavy mortars, light artillery and small arms. According to NDH sources, there were 3,000 Chetniks attacking Višegrad.

Attack on Višegrad 
According to the plan of attack, developed by Zaharije Ostojić, the attack on Višegrad was organized from both left and right bank of river Drina. The attack from the left bank was planned to start one hour earlier than attack from the right bank, with intention to provoke German forces to leave bunkers on the right side to support their forces on the left side of the river. The attack started in 4 am on 5 October 1943.

Before Chetniks stormed into Višegrad they first destroyed four smaller bridges in Mokra Gora. The Chetnik forces began with preparation movement for this battle during the night of 2 October 1943. Two days later Chetniks attacked Axis troops garrisoned in Višegrad. There was a fierce fighting between the Axis garrison and Chetniks. German forces did not actively participate in Višegrad's defence. They withdrew their forces towards Rogatica and were not attacked by the Chetniks. Only the gendarmerie platoon remained in Višegrad. The strongest resistance was on the right side of the Rzav River, where the Muslim milita fought.

The bridge was taken by assault of Chetniks who used only hand grenades. The casualties of Chetniks were 21 dead and 30 wounded. Predojević, several officers, and an entire Home Guard company were captured by the Chetniks.

At the beginning of October 1943, based on Armstrong's instructions Mihailović and his Chetniks organized the attack on Višegrad, captured the town and destroyed the railway bridge across river Drina on Sarajevo-Užice railway. This bridge was the longest bridge in Axis occupied Yugoslavia destroyed by rebel guerrilla. In this attack about 2,500 Chetniks killed about 350 Ustaše and German soldiers and captured a lot of ammunition and arms. The Axis forces had 400 wounded. The bridge near Višegrad was destroyed with help of British sappers commanded by British Major Archie Jack.

Aftermath 
The BBC credited communist forces of Yugoslav Partisans for the successful anti-Axis campaign of Chetniks in Višegrad. The BBC did not make any corrections although the people and institutions who protested because of this misinformation included Kenneth Pickthorn and officials of Yugoslav government in exile in London. After the capture of Višegrad, the Chetniks also captured Rogatica on 14 and 15 October and killed more than 200 of the enemy. The BBC again credited communist forces with this success. The Chetnik forces then advanced toward Sokolac, using arms captured from Germans and Ustaše.

When Chetniks attacked Axis forces in Sokolac on 21 October 1943, the Partisans attacked them from rear. In his report Mihailović emphasized that this was the best proof that communists closely collaborated with Ustaše and Germans.

The number of Bosnian Muslims civilians who had been slaughtered by Chetniks during the offensive ranges between more than 2,000 in Višegrad, in spite their Serb neighbors attempts to hide them, and an unknown number who fell victim to Chetnik massacres in Rogatica, a small town on Romanija plateau, whose Bosnian Muslim civilian population mostly fled in anticipation of the attack. The most of Bosnian Muslim refugees of Rogatica town and surrounding plateau villages accompanied Germans and Ustaše in their own retreat from the area.

References

Sources 

 
 
 
 
 
 
 
 
 
 
 
 
 

Battles of World War II involving Chetniks
Battles of World War II involving Germany
Yugoslavia in World War II
1943 in Serbia
1943 in Croatia
October 1943 events